Wellington People Football Club, is a Sierra Leonean football club based in Wellington, a neighborhood in the East End of Freetown, Sierra Leone. The club is currently playing in the Sierra Leone National First Division, the second highest football league. The club was playing in the Sierra Leone National Premier League during the 2005–2006 season but was relegated to the second division at the end of that season.

The club is owned by journalist and cabinet minister Paul Kamara.

Newly signed Players Division One 

Mohamed Bailor Barrie__
Ibrahim Barrie.

Wellington People Football Club, is a Sierra Leonean football club based in Wellington, a neighborhood in the East End of Freetown, Sierra Leone. The club is currently playing in the Sierra Leone National First Division, the second highest football league. The club was playing in the Sierra Leone National Premier League during the 2005/2006 season but was relegated to the second division at the end of that season.

Sources
 Sierra Leone

References 

Football clubs in Sierra Leone